Cidamón is a village in the province and autonomous community of La Rioja, Spain.

Notable people 
 Luís María Peña Blanco (1936-2017): Businessman

References

Populated places in La Rioja (Spain)